Major General Charles Seymour Collins,  is a senior British Army officer, who currently serves as the Assistant Chief of the General Staff.

Military career
Collins was commissioned into the Royal Green Jackets in 1995. He was appointed commanding officer of the 5th Battalion of The Rifles in 2012 and was deployed in that role to Afghanistan. He went on to be commander of 7th Infantry Brigade in 2014 and was then Assistant Chief of Staff (Plans) at Permanent Joint Headquarters in 2018 before becoming General Officer Commanding 1st (United Kingdom) Division in September 2020. He became Assistant Chief of the General Staff in 2022. 

Collins was appointed a Member of the Order of the British Empire in the 2010 Birthday Honours, and was awarded the Distinguished Service Order for his service in Afghanistan on 25 March 2011. He was advanced to Officer of the Order of the British Empire on 3 July 2015.

References

Year of birth missing (living people)
Living people
British Army major generals
Companions of the Distinguished Service Order
Officers of the Order of the British Empire